Celeste Poma  (born 10 November 1991) is an Italian volleyball player, playing in position libero.

References

External links
 LegaVolleyFemminile profile
 Women.Volleybox profile

1991 births
Living people
Italian women's volleyball players